A list of films produced in Argentina in 1997:

Images

See also
1997 in Argentina

External links and references
 Argentine films of 1997 at the Internet Movie Database

1997
Argentine
Films